Teranyssus is a genus of mites in the family Teranyssidae, the sole genus in the family. There is currently only one species in this genus, Teranyssus howardensis.

References

Mesostigmata
Acari genera
Monotypic arachnid genera